is a Japanese football player. On 4 February 2023, It was announced that he signed for 2022 Cambodian Premier League's Champion Phnom Penh Crown.

Club statistics
Updated to end of 2018 season.

References

External links
Profile at Omiya Ardija

1992 births
Living people
Association football people from Saitama Prefecture
Japanese footballers
J1 League players
J2 League players
Urawa Red Diamonds players
Omiya Ardija players
Fagiano Okayama players
Mito HollyHock players
FC Ryukyu players
Phnom Penh Crown FC players
Shintaro Shimizu
Shintaro Shimizu
Expatriate footballers in Cambodia
Japanese expatriate sportspeople in Cambodia
Association football forwards